Antonio Albergati (16 September 1566 – 13 January 1634) was a Roman Catholic prelate who served as Bishop of Bisceglie (1609–1627), Apostolic Nuncio to Germany (1610–1621), and Apostolic Collector to Portugal (1621–1624).

Biography
Antonio Albergati, son of the philosopher Fabio, was born in Bologna, Italy on 16 September 1566 and ordained a priest on 2 August 1609.
On 3 August 1609, he was appointed during the papacy of Pope Paul V as Bishop of Bisceglie.
On 23 August 1609, he was consecrated bishop by Giovanni Garzia Mellini, Bishop of Imola, with Domenico Rivarola, Titular Archbishop of Nazareth, and Antonio d'Aquino, Bishop of Sarno, serving as co-consecrators. 
On 26 April 1610, he was appointed during the papacy of Pope Paul V as Apostolic Nuncio to Germany
On 15 September 1621, he was appointed during the papacy of Pope Paul V as Apostolic Collector to Portugal where he served until his resignation in 1624.
He served as Bishop of Bisceglie until his resignation in 1627. He died on 13 Jan 1634.

Episcopal succession
While bishop, he was the principal consecrator of:
Stephen Strecheus, Titular Bishop of Dionysias and Auxiliary Bishop of Liège (1615); 
Gereon Otto von Gutmann zu Sobernheim, Titular Bishop of Cyrene and Auxiliary Bishop of Cologne (1616);
and the principal co-consecrator of:
Vincenzo Napoli, Bishop of Patti (1609).

References

External links and additional sources
 (for Chronology of Bishops) 
 (for Chronology of Bishops) 
 (for Chronology of Bishops) 
 (for Chronology of Bishops) 
 (for Chronology of Bishops) 
 (for Chronology of Bishops) 

17th-century Italian Roman Catholic bishops
Bishops appointed by Pope Paul V
1566 births
1634 deaths
Apostolic Nuncios to Portugal
Apostolic Nuncios to Germany